Nepal Federation of Indigenous Nationalities (NEFIN), is a national level umbrella organisation of indigenous peoples/nationalities in Nepal founded in 1991 as the Nepal Federation of Nationalities (NEFEN).

In 2003, the organization was renamed as the Nepal Federation of Indigenous Nationalities.

In 2019 the organisation consists of 56 indigenous member organizations.

Jagat Baram is the actual elected chairman of the organisation, elected in December 2016.

See also
 Nepal Indigenous Nationalities Students' Federation

References

External links
 Nepal Federation of indigenous Nationalities - official website

Indigenous organisations in Nepal
1991 establishments in Nepal